Women's Footballer of the Year may refer to the following annual awards:
 African Women's Footballer of the Year, awarded by the Confederation of African Football
 BBC Women's Footballer of the Year, awarded by the BBC World Service
 FWA Women's Footballer of the Year, awarded by the Football Writers' Association
 PFA Women's Footballer of the Year, awarded by the Professional Footballers Australia
 Women's Footballer of the Year (Germany), awarded by the Association of German Sports Journalists and the publication kicker

See also
 Ukrainian Woman Footballer of the Year